= Theater Ulüm =

Theatre in Ulm, Bade-Württemberg, Germany

Coordinates: 48°23′33″N 9°59′06″E

Theater Ulüm is a theatre in Ulm, Baden-Württemberg, Germany. It was established in 1998. The theatre has many funny stage plays with some serious messages, that are mostly about integration, bilingualism, dual citizenship, women's rights, men society, generational conflicts and so on. The plays are all written by the Turkish playwright Aydın Engin. Its permanent venue is in Ulm. It mainly brings stage plays for Turks living in Germany and Germans of Turkish origin in their native language, but with German-language passages. For interested German-born spectators, there are German-language textbooks.

The Ulüm is in southern Germany so far the only Turkish theater with its own house (Schillerstr. 1).
